Monnina haughtii is a species of plant in the family Polygalaceae. It is endemic to Ecuador.

References

haughtii
Flora of Ecuador
Endangered plants
Taxonomy articles created by Polbot